Mohammed Aoulad Youssef (born 29 August 1991) is a Belgian professional footballer who plays as a centre-forward for Al-Khalidiya SC in Bahrain

Club career 

Aoulad made his debut for Westerlo at 26 July 2014 against Lokeren in a 1–0 home win. Previously, he played for FC Brussels, Sporting Charleroi, Waasland-Beveren and Sint-Truiden.

After a year in Morocco with Botola club Wydad Casablanca, Aoulad joined K.S.V. Roeselare, with the Belgian First Division B club announcing a two-year contract on 1 September 2018.

References

External links
 
 

1991 births
Living people
Footballers from Brussels
Belgian footballers
Belgian expatriate footballers
Association football forwards
R.S.C. Anderlecht players
R.W.D.M. Brussels F.C. players
R. Charleroi S.C. players
S.K. Beveren players
Sint-Truidense V.V. players
K.V.C. Westerlo players
Royale Union Saint-Gilloise players
Wydad AC players
K.S.V. Roeselare players
A.F.C. Tubize players
Belgian Pro League players
Challenger Pro League players
Botola players
Belgian expatriates in Bahrain
Expatriate footballers in Bahrain